The 2005 All-Ireland Intermediate Hurling Championship was the 22nd staging of the All-Ireland hurling championship. The championship began on 15 May 2005 and ended on 3 September 2005.

Cork were the defending champions, however, they were defeated in the All-Ireland semi-final. Wexford won the title after defeating Galway by 1–15 to 0–16 in the final.

Team summaries

Results

Leinster Intermediate Hurling Championship

Munster Intermediate Hurling Championship

All-Ireland Intermediate Hurling Championship

References

Intermediate
All-Ireland Intermediate Hurling Championship